Odmar Færø (born 1 November 1989) is a Faroese footballer who plays as a centre-back for KÍ. Færø has represented the Faroe Islands national football team and previously played for Hamarkameratene, B36 Tórshavn, Keith, Brøndby IF, Forfar Athletic and Banks O' Dee.

Career
Færø played his youth football in Scotland where his father, ex-Faroese international player Oddmar, worked as a dentist. He was called up to the Faroe Islands U19 squad in 2006 while still a player at Highland League side, Keith. Færø moved to the Faroe Islands at the age of 17, joining B36 Tórshavn.

Færø returned to Scotland in 2011 to attend Robert Gordon University in Aberdeen on a sports scholarship, and signed for Scottish club Forfar Athletic in August 2012. 
He stayed at Forfar Athletic until June 2014, making 21 appearances. Færø made his full debut for the Faroe Islands against Germany in September 2012, becoming the first Loons player to earn an international cap.

He rejoined B36 in June 2014, moving on to become National Champions in 2014 and 2015. Færø spent the early part of 2016 at Scottish Junior side Banks O' Dee and was named their player of the year before returning to B36 in June 2016. In 2018 he led his team to win the National Cup in a very dramatic final.

He has played two matches for B36 Tórshavn in the UEFA Champions League (First qualifying round) in July 2012 against Linfield. He then played two matches for B36 in the 2014–15 Europa League first qualifying round, again against Linfield. In 2018–19 UEFA Europa League he captained his team to reach 2nd qualifying round, where Beşiktaş was too strong an opponent.

On 3 September 2019, Færø agreed to signed for KÍ on a contract starting 1 January 2020.

International goals
Scores and results list Faroe Islands' goal tally first.

References

External links 

Odmar Færø on FaroeSoccer.com (Landsdystir means matches for the national teams of the Faroe Islands, including the youth national teams)
Football.fo - a list of all Faroese football players who have been capped for the national team of the Faroe Islands.

1989 births
Living people
People from Tórshavn
Faroese footballers
Faroe Islands international footballers
Faroese expatriate footballers
Expatriate footballers in Scotland
B36 Tórshavn players
Brøndby IF players
Forfar Athletic F.C. players
Keith F.C. players
Banks O' Dee F.C. players
KÍ Klaksvík players
Association football central defenders
Scottish Football League players
Scottish Junior Football Association players
Faroe Islands youth international footballers
Faroese expatriate sportspeople in Scotland
Faroe Islands Premier League players